David Williamson McNicol  (20 June 191318 September 2001) was an Australian public servant and diplomat.

Early life and career
McNicol was born on 20 June 1913 in Adelaide. He was educated at Carey Baptist Grammar School and King's College. He graduated from the University of Adelaide with a Bachelor of Arts degree in the 1930s.

During World War II, McNicol served in the RAAF as a pilot.

Diplomatic career
McNicol joined the Commonwealth Public Service in the Department of External Affairs in 1946.

McNicol was a member of an Australian delegation responsible for negotiating the Manila treaty in September 1954. In December 1954, McNicol's appointment as Minister to Vietnam, Laos and Cambodia was announced. In January 1955 the Australian Government announced McNicol's residence for the post would be at the new Australian Legation in Cambodia, to be opened in February that year.

From 1957 to 1960 McNicol was High Commissioner to Singapore, at the time Lee Kuan Yew was  moving the country towards independence.

He was High Commissioner to Pakistan from 1962 to 1965 His Pakistan appointment was announced by then Minister for External Affairs Garfield Barwick in July 1962.

In June 1968 then Minister for External Affairs Paul Hasluck announced McNicol's appointment as Ambassador to Thailand. At the same time, he was also appointed Australia's council representative to SEATO, the South-East Asian Treaty Organisation.

In December 1972, then Prime Minister Gough Whitlam appointed McNicol Deputy High Commissioner in London.

Awards
In the 1966 New Year Honours, McNicol was appointed a Commander of the Order of the British Empire whilst High Commissioner in Wellington, New Zealand.

Retirement and later life
McNicol retired on 20 June 1978.

He died on 18 September 2001 in Canberra.

References

1913 births
2001 deaths
Australian Commanders of the Order of the British Empire
Ambassadors of Australia to Cambodia
Ambassadors of Australia to Laos
Ambassadors of Australia to Thailand
Ambassadors of Australia to Vietnam
High Commissioners of Australia to New Zealand
High Commissioners of Australia to Pakistan
High Commissioners of Australia to Singapore
High Commissioners of Australia to South Africa
High Commissioners of Australia to Botswana
People educated at Carey Baptist Grammar School
University of Adelaide alumni